Muaaz Abdelraheem Gesmallah Abdelrahman (born 25 April 1989) is a Sudanese professional footballer who plays as a forward for Khartoum NC and the Sudan national football team.

References 
 

1989 births
Living people
Sudanese footballers
Sudan international footballers
Association football forwards
Al Khartoum SC players
El Hilal SC El Obeid players